Alampur Bhakha  or commonly known as Alampur is a village in Jalandhar. Jalandhar is a district of Indian state Punjab.

About 
Alampur lies on the Kartarpur-Bhogpur road.  
The nearest railway station to Alampur is Kartarpur railway station at a distance of 8 km.

Post code 
Alampur's Post code is 144622.

References 

 Official Indian postal site with Alampur's pin code

Villages in Jalandhar district